Kanbara may refer to:

 , Shizuoka - It was a town located in Ihara District, Shizuoka Prefecture, Japan.
 -juku - It was the fifteenth of the fifty-three stations of the Tōkaidō.
  - It is famous as the village buried during the 1783 eruption of Mount Asama, which killed 466 people.